Bokaro district is one of the most industrialized zones in India. It is one of the twenty-four districts of the Jharkhand state, India. It was established in 1991 by carving out one subdivision consisting of two blocks from Dhanbad District and six blocks from Giridih District.

Economy
Bokaro is one of the most industrial district in Jharkhand. It is home to the Asia’s largest steel plant. It is the hub of economic activity in East India. It is home to many companies such as SAIL, Vedanta Limited, Dalmia Cement Bharat Limited, Jaypee Cement (Bokaro Jaypee Cement Limited), ONGC and Orica. It has many thermal power station such as Chandrapura DVC Thermal Power Station, Tenughat DVC Thermal Power Station and so many. It is also home to the first explosive factory in India which is located in Gomia. Sudha Dairy has a manufacturing unit here in Bokaro Steel City’s Sector 12.

Demographics
According to the 2011 census, Bokaro district has a population of 2,062,330, This gives it a ranking of 222nd in India (out of a total of 640). Its population growth rate over the decade 2001–2011 was 15.99%. Bokaro has a sex ratio of 916 females for every 1000 males, and a literacy rate of 73.48%. Schedule Caste (SC) constitutes 14.5% while Schedule Tribe (ST) were 12.4% of total population.

79.35% of the population is Hindu, 11.71% Muslim, and 7.78% Others.

Languages

At the time of the 2011 Census of India, 46.23% of the population in the district spoke Khortha, 13.61% Hindi, 11.39% Santali, 10.67% Bengali, 5.71% Bhojpuri, 4.09% Urdu, 4.04% Magahi and 1.14% Maithili as their first language.

Politics 

 |}

Notable people 

 Ravi Prakash, founder of Screamer (screamer.in) and COVIDEXCHANGE.
 Sambit Patra, National spoke person of Bharatiya Janata Party.

Geography

References

External links

 Bokaro District website

 
Districts of Jharkhand
Coal mining districts in India
1991 establishments in Bihar